Philosophical Psychology is a peer-reviewed academic journal devoted to the links between philosophy and psychology.

The journal publishes research in ethical and philosophical issues emerging from the cognitive sciences, social sciences, and affective sciences, neurosciences, comparative psychology, clinical psychology, psychopathology, psychiatry, psychoanalysis, educational psychology, health psychology, analytic philosophy, moral psychology, phenomenology, history of psychology, and experimental philosophy. 

According to the Journal Citation Reports, the journal has a 2021 impact factor of 1.573.

Since January 2021, Philosophical Psychology subscribes to the British Philosophical Association Good Practice Scheme and to the Barcelona Principles for a Globally Inclusive Philosophy, taking steps to ensure that members of underrepresented groups in academic philosophy (such as women and non-native speakers of English) are involved as journal editors, editorial board members, authors, and readers. (For more information, see )

Philosophical Psychology has calls for papers on topics of interest to the general public that can be investigated by philosophers and psychologists, such as collective irrationalities, bias, and trustworthiness.

Societies 
Philosophical Psychology has links with the European Society for Philosophy and Psychology (ESPP).

Most cited articles
Partial list of most cited articles (in date order):

  Pdf.
 
 
 
  Pdf.

See also 
 List of ethics journals
 List of philosophy journals

References

External links 
 

Publications established in 1988
Philosophy of mind journals
Taylor & Francis academic journals
English-language journals